S100 calcium-binding protein A6 (S100A6) is a protein that in humans is encoded by the S100A6 gene.

Function 

The protein encoded by this gene is a member of the S100 family of proteins containing 2 EF-hand calcium-binding motifs. S100 proteins are localized in the cytoplasm and/or nucleus of a wide range of cells, and involved in the regulation of a number of cellular processes such as cell cycle progression and differentiation. S100 genes include at least 13 members which are located as a cluster on chromosome 1q21. This protein may function in stimulation of Ca2+-dependent insulin release, stimulation of prolactin secretion, and exocytosis. Chromosomal rearrangements and altered expression of this gene have been implicated in melanoma.

Interactions 

S100A6 has been shown to interact with S100B and SUGT1.

Pathology
S100A6 to be reported as possible diagnostic marker of papillary thyroid carcinoma.

References

Further reading 

 
 
 
 
 
 
 
 
 
 
 
 
 
 
 
 
 
 
 

S100 proteins